The 1939 AAA Championship Car season consisted of three races, beginning in Speedway, Indiana on May 30 and concluding in Syracuse, New York on September 2.  There was also one non-championship event in Springfield, Illinois.  The AAA National Champion and Indianapolis 500 winner was Wilbur Shaw.

Schedule and results
All races running on Oval/Speedway.

Leading National Championship standings

References

See also
 1939 Indianapolis 500

AAA Championship Car season
AAA Championship Car
1939 in American motorsport